The United States Post Office Nowata, at 109 N. Pine St. in Nowata, Oklahoma, was built in 1938.  It was listed on the National Register of Historic Places in 2009.

It is Art Deco in style, with design credited to Louis Simon. It currently maintains an unsatisfactory Google rating of one star.

Mural 
It includes a New Deal program mural by artist Woody Crumbo.

See also
List of United States post office murals

References

National Register of Historic Places in Nowata County, Oklahoma
Art Deco architecture in Oklahoma
Government buildings completed in 1938
Post office buildings on the National Register of Historic Places in Oklahoma
1938 establishments in Oklahoma